The Armed Forces of Senegal consists of about 17,000 personnel in the army, air force, navy, and gendarmerie. The Senegal military force receives most of its training, equipment, and support from France and the United States. Germany also provides support but on a smaller scale.

Military noninterference in political affairs has contributed to Senegal's stability since independence. Senegal has participated in many international and regional peacekeeping missions. Most recently, in 2000, Senegal sent a battalion to the Democratic Republic of Congo to participate in MONUC, the United Nations peacekeeping mission.

Senegal also agreed to deploy a United States-trained battalion to Sierra Leone to participate in UNAMSIL, another UN peacekeeping mission. The training operation was designated Operation Focus Relief and involved U.S. Army Special Forces from 3rd Special Forces Group training a number of West African battalions, including Nigerian ones.

As one of the largest troop contributors in Africa (per capita) to African Union missions, United Nations missions, and other regional security organizations, the Senegalese military has proven itself to be one of the most effective and reliable militaries on the African continent. This is remarkable given that Senegal is poorer than the average Sub-Saharan African country. Most importantly, the army of Senegal is multi-ethnic, not coup-proofed, and has never attempted a coup d'état, which is a rarity in Africa. Harmonious Senegalese civil-military relations since independence have permitted the creation of an effective 'military enclave' that is a capable institution not a threat to the political leadership in Dakar.

Summary of past military actions 

 In October 1980 and August 1981, the Senegalese military was invited into the Gambia by President Dawda Kairaba Jawara to put down a coup attempt.
 In August 1989, Senegalese-Gambian military cooperation ceased with the dissolution of the Senegambian Confederation.
 In 1990, 500 Senegalese troops were deployed to Saudi Arabia to take part in the Gulf War. 92 of them were killed after the end of the conflict in a plane crash on 21 March 1991.
 In 1992 1,500 men were sent to the ECOMOG peacekeeping group in Liberia.
 In 1994, a battalion-sized force was sent to Rwanda to participate in the UN peacekeeping mission there.
 Senegal intervened in the Guinea-Bissau civil war in 1998 at the request of former President Vieira.
 A Senegalese contingent deployed on a peacekeeping mission to the Central African Republic in 1997.
 In 2017, Senegal deployed troops into the Gambia to support newly elected President Adama Barrow, an action legally justified by UN resolution 2337.

Army 

Since independence the army has gone through a large number of reorganisations. The army's heritage includes the Tirailleurs sénégalais. In 1978, Senegal dispatched a battalion to the Inter-African Force in Zaire, in the aftermath of the Shaba II fighting. The Senegalese contingent was under the command of Colonel Osmane Ndoye. The Senegalese force comprised a parachute battalion from Thiaroye.

The Army currently consists of two divisions, the Operations Division and the Logistic Division. The IISS estimated in 2012 that the Army had a strength of 11,900 soldiers, three armoured battalions the 22nd, 24th, and 25th (at Bignona) and the 26th  at Kolda; there are six infantry battalions numbered 1st to 6th. 3rd Battalion may have been at Kaolack with 4th at Tambacounda at one point.

Also reported is the 12th Battalion of the 2nd Military Zone at Saint Louis (Dakhar Bango), along with the Prytanée militaire de Saint-Louis, a military secondary school.

Although the Senegalese Air Force is geared towards supporting it, the army may have previously maintained its own very small aviation branch, called the "" (like the French army's equivalent), which may have counted up to five light helicopters and two SA330 Puma transport helicopters. The IISS Military Balance 2012 does not list any helicopters in army service.

National Gendarmerie 

The Gendarmerie is a military force which provides policing and security. It includes a Territorial Gendarmerie with general policing duties, and a Mobile Gendarmerie for special tasks and serious public disorder.

The Senegalese gendarmerie evolved out of a French colonial Spahi detachment sent to Senegal in 1845. This detachment (which became today's Red Guard of Senegal) was the cadre around which the "Colonial Gendarmerie" was formed. On independence this became the National Gendarmerie.

The commander is General Abdoulaye Fall (a different person from the current Armed Forces Chief of Staff of the same name), whose rank is divisional general, and whose full job title is "High Commander of the Gendarmerie and Director of Military Justice".

Navy 

It is responsible for securing Senegal's  Atlantic coastline which is strategically located on the extreme west of the African continent. The coastline is divided in two by The Gambia. The navy was created in 1975. The Navy operates two bases, one at Dakar and the other at Elinkine. The navy also patrols the  territorial waters as well as a declared  exclusive economic zone.

The Navy is divided into three branches known as "groupings":

 The Operational Naval Grouping, which is divided into three flotillas and one group:
 The High Seas Patrol Boats,
 The Coastal Surveillance Vessels,
 The Fast Coastal Boats and
 The Transport Group.
 The Naval Support Grouping responsible for ports, repairs, training, and logistics.
 The Fluvial-Maritime Surveillance Grouping.

Air Force 

The air force is orientated towards providing support for ground forces and resembles an army aviation corps. It possesses air-to-air combat aeroplanes, Mil Mi-24 gunship helicopters, as well as transport and reconnaissance aircraft.

Military zones 

At the present time, there are seven military zones:
 Zone n°1 - Dakar
 Zone n°2 - Saint-Louis
 Zone n°3 - Kaolack
 Zone n°4 - Tambacounda
 Zone n°5 - Ziguinchor
 Zone n°6 - Kolda
 Zone n°7 - Thiès
Each zone comprises a garrison office which caters to military issues and a social service office.
The IISS Military Balance listed four zones in 2007.

Equipment

Armored cars 

 30 Panhard AML- 60mm 4x4 
 74 Panhard AML- 90mm 4x4
 70 WMA301/PTL02 105 mm tank hunter
 250 RAM MK3 
 10 M8 Greyhound 37mm 6x6
 4 M20 Greyhound 6x6

Armoured personnel carriers
 25 Nurol Ejder 4x4
 8 Casspir 4x4
 24 Panhard M3 4x4 
 12 M3 Half-track
 some SandCat 4x4 
 6 Dozor-B
 39 PUMA M26-15
Other 'soft-skin' military vehicles not listed by the IISS:
 Ford M151 Jeep 4x4
 Reo M-35 6x6 trucks
 Reo M-44 6x6 trucks
 ACMAT trucks
 M-809 6x6 trucks

Artillery 

 6 M-50 155mm Howitzer
 8 TRF1 155mm Howitzer
 6 M-101 105mm Howitzer
 6 KrAZ-6322PA Bastion-01 122mm multiple rocket launcher
Mortars: 
 8 Brandt 81mm medium mortar 
 8 Brandt 120mm heavy mortar
Anti-tank weapons: 
 4 MBDA MILAN ATGM Launchers
 31 LRAC F1 89mm Light Anti-Tank Rocket Launcher
Air defence weapons:
 21 53-T-2/M-693 20mm AAGs 
 12 Bofors L-60 40mm AAGs
Source: IISS Military Balance 2012, 450.

Infantry weapons 

 MAC Mle 1950
 PAMAS G1
 SIG Sauer P220
 CETME Model L
 Colt M16A1/A2
 Colt M4
 Colt M723
 Daewoo K1
 FAMAS
 IWI Tavor
 Norinco CQ
 Taurus T4
 IMI Galatz
 KNT-76
 SVD Dragunov sniper rifle
 M60 machine gun

Aircraft 
Navy

 2 Metal Shark patrol ships

 3 Shaldag MK II patrol ships

 1 Shaldag MK V patrol ships

Citations 

Part of this article is derived from the equivalent article at French Wikipedia

References

External links 
 Website of the Armed Forces of Senegal.

 
Law of Senegal
Law enforcement in Senegal